Coremia plumipes  is a species of beetle in the family Cerambycidae. It was described by Pallas in 1772.

References

Rhopalophorini
Beetles described in 1772
Taxa named by Peter Simon Pallas